The 34th Arizona State Legislature, consisting of the Arizona State Senate and the Arizona House of Representatives, was constituted in Phoenix from January 1, 1979, to December 31, 1980, during the first two years of Bruce Babbitt's first full term as Governor of Arizona. Both the Senate and the House membership remained constant at 30 and 60, respectively. The Republicans managed to regain control of the Senate by picking up two seats, giving them a 16–14 edge in the upper house. In the lower chamber, the Republicans increased their majority by 4 seats, giving them a 42–18 margin.

Sessions
The Legislature met for two regular sessions at the State Capitol in Phoenix. The first opened on January 8, 1979, and adjourned on April 21, while the Second Regular Session convened on January 14, 1980, and adjourned sine die on May 1. There was a single special sessions which convened on November 12, 1979, and adjourned sine die on April 3, 1980.

State Senate

Members

The asterisk (*) denotes members of the previous Legislature who continued in office as members of this Legislature.

House of Representatives

Members 
The asterisk (*) denotes members of the previous Legislature who continued in office as members of this Legislature.

References

Arizona legislative sessions
1979 in Arizona
1980 in Arizona
1979 U.S. legislative sessions
1980 U.S. legislative sessions